Blake Whitlatch (born October 13, 1955) is a former professional American football player who played as a linebacker in the National Football League (NFL) for one season with the New York Jets, in 1978. He played in four games that season. He was drafted by the San Diego Chargers in the ninth round of the 1978 NFL draft. Whitlatch was born in Baton Rouge, Louisiana and attended Broadmoor High School. He attended college at Louisiana State University, where he played college football for the LSU Tigers football team.

References

living people
1955 births
Players of American football from Baton Rouge, Louisiana
Broadmoor High School alumni
LSU Tigers football players
New York Jets players
American football linebackers